Christos Veletanis (born 12 June 1976) is a retired Greek football midfielder.

References

1976 births
Living people
Greek footballers
Athlitiki Enosi Larissa F.C. players
Tyrnavos 2005 F.C. players
Apollon Larissa F.C. players
Olympiacos Volos F.C. players
Levadiakos F.C. players
Ayia Napa FC players
Eordaikos 2007 F.C. players
Pyrgetos F.C. players
Pierikos F.C. players
Super League Greece players
Cypriot First Division players
Association football midfielders
Greek expatriate footballers
Expatriate footballers in Cyprus
Greek expatriate sportspeople in Cyprus
Footballers from Larissa